Cucumis melo, also known as melon, is a species of Cucumis that has been developed into many cultivated varieties. The fruit is a pepo. The flesh is either sweet or bland, with or without a musky aroma, and the rind can be smooth (such as honeydew), ribbed (such as European cantaloupe), wrinkled (such as casaba melon), or netted (such as muskmelon). In North America, the sweet-flesh varieties are often collectively called muskmelon, including the musky netted-rind varieties and the inodorous smooth-rind varieties, and cantaloupe usually means the former type. However, muskmelon in a narrow sense only refers to the musky netted-rind type, while the true cantaloupe is the European type with ribbed and often warty rind that is seldom grown in North America.

The origin of melons is not known. Research has revealed that seeds and rootstocks were among the goods traded along the caravan routes of the Ancient World. Some botanists consider melons native to the Levant and Egypt, while others place their origin in Iran, India or Central Asia. Still others support an African origin, and in modern times wild melons can still be found in some African countries.

Background
The melon is an annual, trailing herb. It grows well in subtropical or warm, temperate climates. Melons prefer warm, well-fertilized soil with good drainage that is rich in nutrients, but are vulnerable to downy mildew and anthracnose. Disease risk is reduced by crop rotation with non-cucurbit crops, avoiding crops susceptible to similar diseases as melons. Cross pollination has resulted in some varieties developing resistance to powdery mildew. Insects attracted to melons include the cucumber beetle, melon aphid, melonworm moth and the pickleworm.

Genetics

Melons are monoecious plants. They do not cross with watermelon, cucumber, pumpkin, or squash, but varieties within the species intercross frequently.
The genome of Cucumis melo was first sequenced in 2012. Some authors treat C. melo as having two subspecies, C. melo agrestis and C. melo melo. Variants within these subspecies fall into groups whose genetics largely agree with their phenotypic traits, such as disease resistance, rind texture, flesh color, and fruit shape. Variants or landraces (some of which were originally classified as species; see the synonyms list to the right) include C. melo var. acidulus, adana, agrestis, ameri, cantalupensis, chandalak, chate, chinensis, chito, conomon, dudaim, flexuosus, inodorus, makuwa, momordica, reticulatus and tibish.

Not all varieties are sweet melons.  The snake melon, also called the Armenian cucumber and Serpent cucumber, is a non-sweet melon found throughout Asia from Turkey to Japan. It is similar to a cucumber in taste and appearance. Outside Asia, snake melons are grown in the United States, Italy, Sudan and parts of North Africa, including Egypt. The snake melon is more popular in Arab countries.

Other varieties grown in Africa are bitter, cultivated for their edible seeds. 

For commercially grown varieties certain features like protective hard netting and firm flesh are preferred for purposes of shipping and other requirements of commercial markets.

Nutrition
Per 100 gram serving, cantaloupe melons provide 34 calories and are a rich source (defined as at least 20% of daily value, or DV) of both vitamin A (68% DV) and vitamin C (61% DV). Other nutrients are at a negligible level. Melons are 90% water and 9% carbohydrates, with less than 1% each of protein and fat.

Uses
In addition to their consumption when fresh, melons are sometimes dried.  Other varieties are cooked, or grown for their seeds, which are processed to produce melon oil.  Still other varieties are grown only for their pleasant fragrance. The Japanese liqueur Midori is flavored with melon.

History 
There is debate among scholars whether the abattiach in The Book of Numbers 11:5 refers to a melon or a watermelon. Both types of melon were known in Ancient Egypt and other settled areas. Some botanists consider melons native to the Levant and Egypt, while others place the origin in Persia, India or Central Asia, thus the origin is uncertain. Researchers have shown that seeds and rootstocks were among the goods traded along the caravan routes of the Ancient World.  Several scientists support an African origin, and in modern times wild melons can still be found in several African countries in East Africa like Ethiopia, Somalia and Tanzania.

Melon was domesticated in West Asia and over time many cultivars developed with variety in shape and sweetness. Iran, India, Uzbekistan, Afghanistan and China become centers for melon production. Melons were consumed in Ancient Greece and Rome.

Gallery

See also

Bailan melon
Barattiere – a landrace variety of melon found in Southern Italy
Canary melon
Carosello – a landrace variety of melon found in Southern Italy
Crane melon
Gaya melon
Hami melon
Korean melon
Melon ball
Melon Day
Montreal melon
Sugar melon

References

External links

 Cucumis melo L. – Purdue University, Center for New Crops & Plant Products.
 Sorting Cucumis names – Multilingual multiscript plant name database
 Cook's Thesaurus: Melons – Varietal names and pictures
 

melo
Fruits originating in Asia
Melons
Plants described in 1753
Taxa named by Carl Linnaeus